The  was a cabinet-level ministry in the Daijō-kan system of government of the Meiji period Empire of Japan from 1870 to 1885. It is also sometimes referred to as the “Ministry of Engineering” or “Ministry of Industry”.

History 
The Cabinet officially announced the establishment of the Public Works on December 12, 1870, by the advice of Edmund Morel, chief engineer of the Railway Construction to achieve rapid social and industrial development. After long arguments of 10 months, on September 28, 1871, the Meiji government completed arrangement of organization of 11 departments, which were mostly transferred from the Ministry of Civil Affairs. It included railroads, shipyards, lighthouses, mines, an iron and steel industry, telecommunication, civil works, manufacturing, industrial promotion, engineering institution and survey. Each department had to be relied on the foreign advisor and officer for a while, but gradually replaced them with Japanese engineers, who received training in the Engineering Institution. Main function of the Engineering Institution was to manage the Imperial College of Engineering (the predecessor of the Tokyo Imperial University College of Engineering). One of the key roles of the ministry was locating, and if necessary, reverse engineering overseas technology. For example, in 1877, only a year after the invention of the telephone, engineers employed by the ministry had obtained examples and were attempting to create a domestic version. By the mid-1880s, many of the industries created by the Ministry of Industry were privatized. With the establishment of the cabinet system under the Meiji Constitution on December 22, 1885, the ministry was abolished, with its functions divided between the new Ministry of Agriculture and Commerce and the Ministry of Communications.

References

Notes 

Industry
Politics of the Empire of Japan
1870 establishments in Japan
1880s disestablishments in Japan
1885 disestablishments in Asia